E. C. Burnett III was an associate justice of the South Carolina Supreme Court. He was elected on March 21, 1995, to fill the unexpired nine years of Judge Randall Bell's term; Judge Bell had died before being sworn into his seat on the South Carolina Supreme Court. Burnett defeated Judge Costa Pleicones by a vote of 102–58.

In 1982 he presided over the trial of Edward Lee Elmore who was wrongfully convicted and sentenced to death row. The trial is used by investigative journalist Raymond Bonner as an example of injustice in his book Anatomy of Injustice: A Murder Case Gone Wrong (2012).

References

Justices of the South Carolina Supreme Court
People from Spartanburg County, South Carolina
1942 births
Living people